The Stanton Street Settlement is a Settlement movement, a 501(c)(3) not-for-profit community organization in New York, New York, United States. Its mission is to provide a safe, caring, tuition-free environment where children from the city's Lower East Side can develop their minds, bodies and spirits.

Historical perspective

The Stanton Street Settlement follows in a long tradition of service. The Settlement movement was started in London at Oxford by Don Barnett, who opened Toynbee Hall in east London. It was a place where service-minded Cambridge and Oxford graduates could work to empower the local poor through educational and social services.

Jane Addams brought the idea to Chicago after visiting and observing the workings of Toynbee Hall. She opened America's first Settlement, Hull House, on 18 September 1889. Under her steadfast leadership Hull-House expanded. She described the difficulties and victories experienced there from 1889 - 1909 in her most famous book, "Twenty Years at Hull-House." It is in her writings that the model of what a Settlement should be is most carefully given:

For her work with Hull-House, Jane Addams won a Nobel Prize in 1931. Her ideas spread to New York, where several Settlements sprang up in the Lower East Side to meet the social and educational needs of the city's growing immigrant population.

The Stanton Street Settlement, founded in 1999, still continues this tradition of community service at 53 Stanton Street. It is a flexible, grass-roots, 100% volunteer program designed to respond to the specific needs of the community. The Settlement currently serves approximately 35 students ages 5 to 16 with the help of 25 volunteer tutors and teachers.

External links
http://www.stantonstreet.org/

Non-profit organizations based in New York City
Community-building organizations
Settlement houses in New York City
Progressive Era in the United States